Cultellus may refer to:
 a Latin word for a small knife or cutlass
 Cultellus (bivalve), a molluscan genus represented in the fossil record